Cut Me Up may refer to:

 "Cut Me Up", a song by Har Mar Superstar from The Handler
 "Cut Me Up", a song by Headstones from Smile and Wave
 "Cut Me Up", a song by Stanton Warriors
 "Cut Me Up Jenny", a song by Taking Back Sunday from New Again
 "Cut Me Up", a song by Miss Alexia